Te Ranga is a settlement in the Western Bay of Plenty District and Bay of Plenty region of New Zealand's North Island.

It was a key site during the New Zealand Wars.

Education

References

Western Bay of Plenty District
Populated places in the Bay of Plenty Region